Qaleh-ye Harateh (also Romanized as Qal‘eh-ye Ḩarateh) is a village in Hati Rural District, Hati District, Lali County, Khuzestan Province, Iran. At the 2006 census, its population was 90, in 20 families.

References 

Populated places in Lali County